Fort de Caluire was an old fortification situated in Caluire-et-Cuire. Now demolished, it was part of the first belt of forts protecting Lyon.

History  

Built in 1831, it was connected to the Fort de Montessuy by a long chamber, from which it defended the approaches to the Croix-Rousse along the road from the Dombes.

Placed on the slope of the Saône it defended the river, along with Fort de Loyasse, Fort Duchère and Fort Saint-Jean. It was square, with a bastion at each corner.

In the 1860s a mushroom farm operated in the underground enclosure connecting the two forts, with the old bastions repurposed into underground grow-rooms. T

Today 
The fort was demolished in 1933 to make way for the construction of the current Henri Cochet stadium. A few clues remain as to its location such as the present street known as the montée (rise or climb) des Forts; the entrance to fort de Caluire was at the current intersection of montée des Forts and avenue Paul Doumer.

See also
Ceintures de Lyon
Fort Saint-Jean (Lyon)

References

Bibliography  
 

Fortifications of Lyon
Fortification lines
Fortifications in France
19th-century fortifications
World War II articles needing attention to supporting materials
19th-century architecture in France